The Arno is a river in the Tuscany region of Italy. It is the most important river of central Italy after the Tiber.

Source and route 

 
The river originates on Monte Falterona in the Casentino area of the Apennines, and initially takes a southward curve. The river turns to the west near Arezzo passing through Florence, Empoli and Pisa, flowing into the Tyrrhenian Sea at Marina di Pisa.

The Casentino, in the province of Arezzo, formed by the upper course of the river until its confluence with the Maestro della Chiana channel.
The Val di Chiana, a plain drained in the 18th century, which until then had been a marshy area tributary of the Tiber.
The upper Valdarno, a long valley bordered on the east by the Pratomagno massif and on the west by the hills around Siena.
The Sieve's basin, which flows into the Arno immediately before Florence.
The middle Valdarno, with the plain including Florence, Sesto Fiorentino, Prato, and Pistoia.
The lower Valdarno, with the valley of important tributaries such as the Pesa, Elsa, and Era and in which, after Pontedera, the Arno flows into the Ligurian Sea. The mouth of the river was once near Pisa but is now several kilometres westwards.

It crosses Florence, where it passes below the Ponte Vecchio and the Santa Trinita bridge (built by Bartolomeo Ammannati but inspired by Michelangelo).

Before Pisa, the Arno is crossed by the Imperial Canal at La Botte. This water channel passes under the Arno through a tunnel, and serves to drain the former area of the Lago di Bientina, which was once the largest lake in Tuscany before its reclamation. 

The flow rate of the Arno is irregular. It is sometimes described as having a torrentlike behaviour, because it can easily go from almost dry to near flood in a few days. New dams built upstream of Florence have greatly alleviated the problem in recent years.

The flood on November 4, 1966 collapsed the embankment in Florence, killing at least 40 people and damaging or destroying millions of works of art and rare books.  New conservation techniques were inspired by the disaster, but even decades later hundreds of works still await restoration.

Etymology 
From Latin Arnus (Pliny, Natural History 3.50). The philologist Hans Krahe related this toponym on a paleo-European basis *Ar-n-, derived from the Proto-Indo-European root *er-, "flow, move".

Ecology 
The Arno river has been strongly affected by non-native species: over 90% of fish species and 70% of macroinvertebrate species in the area around Florence are alien species. These include the European catfish, channel catfish, Crucian carp, common bleak, topmouth gudgeon, New Zealand mud snail, and killer shrimp. The mud crab has been found in the river near Pisa.

Uses and human impacts 
Water from the Arno drainage basin is used for drinking water, irrigation, and firefighting. Citizens in the central part of the drainage basin also identified flood control, support for biodiversity, fisheries, and cultural value as other services that the river provides. There is the risk that flooding will jeopardize these ecosystem services, as 9% of wastewater treatment plants, 10% of landfills or other waste sites, and 4.5% of contaminated sites are at high risk of flooding, which would produce hotspots of pollution.

Gallery

References

External links

Basin Authority of the Arno 

Rivers of Italy
Rivers of Tuscany
Geography of Florence
Geography of Pisa
Rivers of the Province of Arezzo
Rivers of the Province of Florence
Rivers of the Province of Pisa
Rivers of the Province of Prato
Rivers of the Apennines
Drainage basins of the Tyrrhenian Sea